Crown Prince Uiso (27 September 1750 - 17 April 1752) or Crown Prince Successor Uiso, personal name Yi Jeong was a Joseon Crown Prince as the son of Crown Prince Sado and Crown Princess Consort Hyegyeong and was third in line of succession to the throne to King Yeongjo. He was the older brother of King Jeongjo. His Chinese name was Changheung.

Biography
His mother, Lady Hyegyeong, of Pungsan was from a famous royal family line.  His maternal grandfather was Hong Bong-han, whose younger brother was Hong In-han, a minister and later Prime Minister of that time.

He was the first grandson of the 21st King Yeongjo of Joseon and his father, Crown Prince Sado, was the illegitimate second son of King Yeongjo. King Yeongjo's first son, Crown Prince Hyojang, died at the age of 10, leaving Crown Prince Sado as King Yeongjo's only male descendant.  King Yeongjo hoped for another son but instead bore only daughters.

Uiso's father Crown Prince Sado had a severe mental illness and was often at odds with his father, King Yeongjo.  Crown Prince Sado favoured the political party Soron, while King Yeongjo supported the ruling party Noron.  Later King Yeongjo had his son, Crown Prince Sado, executed by locking him in a rice chest and starving him.

On September 27, 1750 he was born Changgyeong Palace Gyeongchun Hall, in Hanseong. King Yeongjo expected great things from him. On May 13, 1751 King Yeongjo declared him the political heir.

In November 1751, his aunt Lady Hyeonbin died, then soon after on 17 April 1752, Crown Prince Uiso died Tongmyongjeon. His grandfather, King Yeongjo took the deaths hard and severed from psychological trauma for some time.

He was given a state funeral of Joseons, from special instructions of King Yeongjo. His body was buried to the south of Mt. Ahnhyon (안현 鞍峴), Bugahyeon-dong in Hanseong. King Yeongjo named his grave Uiso grave and wrote the epitaphs, erecting a tombstone.

In 1870, his grave name was Uiryong Park (의령원 懿寧園). On June 7, 1949, his grave was moved to Wondang in Goyang.

Family 
Father: King Jangjo of Joseon (13 February 1735 – 12 July 1762) (조선 장조)
Grandfather : King Yeongjo of Joseon (31 October 1694 – 22 April 1776) (조선 영조)
Grandmother : Royal Noble Consort Yeong of the Jeonui Lee clan (15 August 1696 – 23 August 1764) (영빈 이씨)
Mother: Queen Heongyeong of the Pungsan Hong clan (6 August 1735 – 13 January 1816) (헌경왕후 홍씨)
Grandfather : Hong Bong-Han (1713 – 1778) (홍봉한)
Grandmother : Lady Lee of the Hansan Lee clan (1713 – 1755) (한산 이씨)
Brother: King Jeongjo of Joseon (28 October 1752 – 18 August 1800) (조선 정조)
Sister-in-law: Queen Hyoui of the Cheongpung Kim clan (5 January 1754 - 10 April 1821) (효의왕후 김씨)
Sister: Princess Cheongyeon (1754 - 9 June 1821) (청연공주)
Brother-in-law: Kim Gi-Seong (? - 1811) (김기성)
Sister: Princess Cheongseon (1756 - 20 July 1802) (청선공주)
Brother-in-law: Jeong Jae-Hwa (1754 - 1790) (정재화)

Ancestry

See also 
 Crown Prince Sado
 Crown Prince Hyojang
 Jeongjo of Joseon
 Crown Prince Munhyo

Site Link 
 Grave of Uiryong , his grave
 민간단체가 허가없이 매장문화재 파헤쳐 매일신문 2008.06.20. 
 조선왕실 장례 지침서 '국조상례보편' 국역 연합뉴스 2008.10.09. 
 의소세손 의령원 부장품 
 외규장각 의궤 공개, grave goods
 외규장각 의궤 공개, grave goods
 외규장각 의궤 공개, grave goods

References

Heirs apparent who never acceded
18th-century Korean people
1750 births
1752 deaths
House of Yi
Korean princes
Royalty and nobility who died as children